The 1892 Brooklyn Grooms season was a season in American baseball. The team finished the first half of the split season in second place, just 2.5 games behind the Boston Beaneaters. However, they faded in the second half, finishing 9.5 games behind the second-half champion Cleveland Spiders and missing out on the postseason playoff. Their combined record was 95–59, third best overall in the league.

The season was a tragic one, as outfielder Hub Collins left a game on May 14 because he was feeling ill. A week later he was dead, the victim of typhoid fever. The team put on a benefit game to raise money for his widow on May 29. One bright spot, however, was first baseman Dan Brouthers, who won the batting title with a .335 batting average.

Regular season

Season standings

Record vs. opponents

Roster

Player stats

Batting

Starters by position 
Note: Pos = Position; G = Games played; AB = At bats; R = Runs; H = Hits; Avg. = Batting average; HR = Home runs; RBI = Runs batted in; SB = Stolen bases

Other batters 
Note: G = Games played; AB = At bats; R = Runs; H = Hits; Avg. = Batting average; HR = Home runs; RBI = Runs batted in; SB = Stolen bases

Pitching

Starting pitchers 
Note: G = Games pitched; IP = Innings pitched; W = Wins; L = Losses; ERA = Earned run average; BB = Bases on balls; SO = Strikeouts; CG = Complete games

Notes

References 
Baseball-Reference season page
Baseball Almanac season page

External links 
Brooklyn Dodgers reference site
Acme Dodgers page 
Retrosheet

Los Angeles Dodgers seasons
Brooklyn Grooms season
Brooklyn
19th century in Brooklyn
Brownsville, Brooklyn